Luis Villalta Aquino (October 2, 1969 in Lima, Peru – March 3, 2004 in Pompano Beach, Florida) was a professional boxer, who was nicknamed "El Puma" during his career.

He moved to Hillsborough Township, New Jersey to be near his trainer and improve his career opportunities while trying to get entry visas for his family. He shared an apartment with two roommates and worked at a local McDonald's.

On February 28, 2004, he defended his North American Boxing Association lightweight title against Ricky Quiles at the Seminole Tribe of Florida Coconut Creek Casino. He collapsed moments after losing a unanimous decision, and was rushed to the North Broward Medical Center. He died after undergoing surgery for head trauma. His wife, Miraebel, and father, Luis, Sr. (granted emergency visas), were at his bedside. He never regained consciousness.

Villalta is the fifth Peruvian fighter to die in the ring. His career record was 29-6-1.

References

1969 births
2004 deaths
Deaths due to injuries sustained in boxing
Sportspeople from Lima
Peruvian male boxers
Sports deaths in Florida
Peruvian emigrants to the United States